Permutationally invariant quantum state tomography (PI quantum state tomography) is a method for the partial determination of the state of a quantum system consisting of many subsystems. 

In general, the number of parameters needed to describe the quantum mechanical state of a system consisting of  subsystems is increasing exponentially with  In the case of a system consisting of  qubits, which is perhaps the most relevant case,  real parameters are needed to describe the state vector of a pure state, or
 real parameters are needed to describe the  density matrix of a mixed state. Quantum state tomography is a method to determine all these parameters from a series of measurements on many independent and identically prepared systems. Thus, in the case of full quantum state tomography, the number of measurements needed scales exponentially with the number of particles or qubits. 

For large systems, the determination of the entire quantum state is no longer possible in practice and one is interested in methods that determine only a subset of the parameters necessary to characterize the quantum state that still contains important information about the state. Permutationally invariant quantum tomography is such a method needing fewer measurements than state tomography. PI quantum tomography only measures  the permutationally invariant part of the density matrix. For the procedure, it is sufficient to carry out local measurements on the subsystems. If the state is close to being permutationally invariant, which is the case in many practical situations, then  is close to the  density matrix of the system.
Even if the state is not permutationally invariant,  can still be used for entanglement detection and computing relevant operator expectations values. Thus, the procedure does not assume the permutationally invariance of the quantum state. In other words, permutationally invariant quantum tomography is considered scalable.

The method can be used, for example, for the reconstruction of the density matrices of systems with more than 10 particles, for photonic systems, for trapped cold ions or systems in cold atoms.

The permutationally invariant part of the density matrix 

PI state tomography reconstructs the permutationally invariant part of the density matrix, which is defined as the equal mixture of the quantum states obtained after permuting the particles in all the possible ways 

where  denotes the kth permutation. For instance, for  we have two permutations.  leaves the order of the two particles unchanged.  exchanges the two particles. In general, for  particles, we have  permutations.

It is easy to see that  is the density matrix that is obtained if the order of the particles is not taken into account. This corresponds to an experiment in which a subset of  particles is randomly selected from a larger ensemble. The state of this smaller group is of course permutationally invariant.

The number of degrees of freedom of  scales polynomially with the number of particles.  For a system of  qubits (spin- particles)  the number of real degrees of freedom is

The measurements needed to determine the permutationally invariant part of the density matrix 

To determine these degrees of freedom,

local measurement settings are needed. Here, a local measurement settings means that the operator  is to be measured on each particle. By repeating the measurement and collecting enough data, all two-point, three-point and higher order correlations can be determined.

Efficient determination of a physical state 

So far we have discussed that the number of measurements scales polynomially with the number of qubits. 

In order the entire tomographic procedure to be scalable, we need that we store the state in the computer in a scalable way. Clearly, the straightforward way of storing the -qubit state in a  density matrix is not scalable. However,  is a blockdiagonal matrix due to its permutational invariance and thus it can be stored much more efficiently.

Moreover, it is well known that due to statistical fluctuations and systematic errors the density matrix obtained from the measured state by linear inversion is not positive semidefinite and it has some negative eigenvalues. An important step in a typical tomography is fitting a physical, i. e., positive semidefinite density matrix on the tomographic data. This step often represents a bottleneck in the overall process in full state tomography. However, PI tomography, as we have just discussed, allows the density matrix to be stored much more efficiently, which also allows an efficient fitting using convex optimization. This makes the whole process scalable. Furthermore, the convex optimization guarantees that the solution is a global optimum.

Characteristics of the method 

PI tomography is commonly used in experiments involving permutationally invariant states. If the density matrix  obtained by PI tomography is entangled, then density matrix of the system,  is also entangled. Remarkably, the entanglement detection carried out in this way does not assume that the quantum system itself is permutationally invariant. 

Thus, we can obtain the fidelity with respect to the above mentioned quantum states as the expectation value of the corresponding projectors in the state

Links to other approaches 

There are other approaches for tomography that need fewer measurements than full quantum state tomography. As we have discussed, PI tomography is typically most useful for quantum states that are close to being permutionally invariant. Compressed sensing is especially suited for low rank states. Matrix product state tomography is most suitable for, e.g., cluster states and ground states of spin models. Permutationally invariant tomography can be combined with compressed sensing. In this case, the number of local measurement settings needed can even be smaller than for permutationally invariant tomography.

Experiments 

Permutationally invariant tomography has been tested experimentally for a four-qubit symmetric Dicke state  and also for a six-qubit symmetric Dicke in photons, and has been compared to full state tomography and compressed sensing. A simulation of permutationally invariant tomography shows that reconstruction of a positive semidefinite density matrix of 20 qubits from measured data is possible in a few minutes on a standard computer. The hybrid method combining permutationally invariant tomography and compressed sensing has also been tested.

References 

Quantum mechanics
Tomography